Flávio E. Cabral (July 7, 1916 – March 22, 1990) was an American mural artist.

Life

Cabral was born in New York City of Portuguese parents who resided on the island of Trinidad, in the West Indies. He lived in New York City until 1936 when his family moved to Los Angeles where he settled for the remainder of his life. As a young artist, he received much of his training through his work and affiliation with the Federal Arts Project under the administration of President Franklin D. Roosevelt. In 1955 he earned a Bachelor of Arts Degree in art education. The following year he attained a Master of Arts Degree in Painting from the State University at Los Angeles. He was a professor of painting and art history for over thirty years at Los Angeles Valley College.

Reproduced in
 "American Painting and Sculpting" University of Illinois
 "The Realm of Contemporary Still Life Painting"
 "Oil Painting Techniques and Materials"
 "Who's Who in the West"
 1963 – 60 ft. mural for Robert Fulton Jr. High School*

References

External links
http://www.aaa.si.edu/collections/interviews/oral-history-interviews-flavio-emanuel-cabral-11870
http://www.artnet.com/artists/flavio-cabral/past-auction-results

1916 births
1990 deaths
American muralists
20th-century American painters
American male painters
Federal Art Project artists
Painters from New York City
American people of Portuguese descent
California State University, Los Angeles alumni
Los Angeles Valley College people
20th-century American male artists